Animal Now is an album by British punk band The Ruts D.C., following a name change from "The Ruts." It was released in 1981 on Virgin Records.

The album is notable for having some interesting run-out etchings on the vinyl.  The Side A etching reads "BEWARE..."; the Side B etching reads "...THE CURSE OF ODIN."

Track listing
All songs written by Dave Ruffy, John Jennings, Gary Barnacle and Paul Fox

Side A
"Mirror Smashed" 3:27
"Dangerous Minds" 3:34
"Slow Down" 4:23
"Despondency" 3:48
"Different View" 4:01

Side B
"No Time To Kill" 4:37
"Fools" 6:34
"Walk Or Run" 3:28
"Parasites" 5:25

Personnel
Ruts DC
John "Segs" Jennings - Vocals, Keyboards, Bass
Paul Fox - Vocals, Guitars, Keyboards
Dave Ruffy - Vocals, Drums, Piano Strings, Percussion
Gary Barnacle - Tenor, Alto, Baritone & Soprano Saxophones, Synthesized Saxophones, Keyboards
with:
Bill Barnacle - Trumpet on "Dangerous Minds" and "Fools"
Louise Freedman - Additional Vocals on "No Time to Kill"

Production
Produced by The Ruts D.C. & John Brand
Engineered by John Brand

References

External links
"Animal Now" at discogs

1981 albums
The Ruts albums
Virgin Records albums